Grey Suit is the second extended play by South Korean singer Suho. It was released on April 4, 2022, by SM Entertainment. The EP contains six tracks including the lead single of the same name. The physical album is available in three versions two photobook versions and one digipack version

Background and release
On March 10, 2022, SM Entertainment announced that Suho will release his second solo album in April 2022. On March 14, 2022, it was announced that Suho will release his second extended play Grey Suit on April 4.

Track listing

Charts

Weekly charts

Monthly charts

Year-end charts

Release history

References

2022 EPs
Suho albums
Korean-language EPs
SM Entertainment EPs